The 21st United States Colored Infantry Regiment was a U.S.C.T. infantry regiment in the Union Army during the American Civil War. It was organized from the 3rd South Carolina Infantry (African Descent) and the 4th South Carolina Infantry (African Descent) in March 1864 under the command of Col. Milton S. Littlefield. It served in South Carolina and Georgia until the end of the war; it was mustered out in October 1866.

See also
 List of United States Colored Troops Civil War units

Sources
 South Carolina Civil War soldiers website

United States Colored Troops Civil War units and formations
1864 establishments in South Carolina
Military units and formations established in 1864
Units and formations of the Union Army from South Carolina
Military units and formations disestablished in 1866